The Iraqi List is a political party list in the Iraqi National Assembly election, 2005, consisting of mainly secular Shia.  It is dominated by the Iraqi National Accord led by former exile and interim prime minister Iyad Allawi.

Other members include the Council of Iraq's Notables, the Iraqi Democrats Movement, the Democratic National Awakening Party, the Loyalty to Iraq Grouping, and the Iraqi Independents Association all of which are much smaller.

In 2005 Iraqi election the Iraqi list received  13.82% of the votes, earning them 40 seats in the transitional National Assembly of Iraq.

Prior to the December 2005 elections the list merged with several other parties to form the Iraqi National List.

External list
Iraqi List official website (archived)

Electoral lists for Iraqi elections
Political party alliances in Iraq